Jung Yu-ra (born 6 February 1992), also known at Jeong Yu-ra or Jung Yura, is a South Korean handball player for Colorful Daegu and the South Korean national team.

Career
Internationally, Jung has represented South Korea several times at the Summer Olympics. Her team placed fourth in 2012, tenth in 2016, and eight at the 2020 Summer Olympics. She was also part of the Korean team that won gold medals at the 2014 Asian Games, and another gold at the 2018 Asian Games.

References

External links
 Yura JUNG at the International Hockey Federartion
 
 

1992 births
Living people
South Korean female handball players
Olympic handball players of South Korea
Handball players at the 2012 Summer Olympics
Handball players at the 2016 Summer Olympics
Handball players at the 2020 Summer Olympics
Asian Games gold medalists for South Korea
Asian Games medalists in handball
Handball players at the 2014 Asian Games
Handball players at the 2018 Asian Games
Medalists at the 2014 Asian Games
Medalists at the 2018 Asian Games
Universiade medalists in handball
Universiade silver medalists for South Korea
Handball players from Seoul
Medalists at the 2015 Summer Universiade
21st-century South Korean women